Dublin 1, also rendered as D1 and D01, is a historic postal district on the northside of Dublin, Ireland.

Area profile 
D1 lies entirely within the Dublin Central constituency of the Irish parliament, the Dáil. The Dublin Central constituency is one of the most densely populated and socially and ethnically diverse places in Ireland. The postcode consists of most of the northern city centre, affluent white collar areas around and including Mayor Square, and traditional working class areas such as Sheriff Street. In 2019, the Irish Independent reported that Dublin City Council embarked on a plan to improve lighting and surfacing in the area's laneways while Ireland's National Tourism Development Authority has said the regeneration of a historic part of Dublin 1 tied to the Easter Rising is "long overdue". The American Institute of Architects has been hired by a local business group to help regenerate the area, which they say faces "civic schizophrenia" and "a split personality".

Notable places 
The postcode covers a dense central area north of the River Liffey. It includes O'Connell Street, Parnell Street, Henry Street, Jervis Street, Mountjoy Square, Parnell Square, the International Financial Services Centre, and parts of the northern Docklands. It is home to Busarus, Connolly Station, the Custom House, the Convention Centre Dublin, and several of the north city quays. It also features urban secondary schools such as the O'Connell School and Belvedere College as well as third-level institutions such as the National College of Ireland.

Usage in Dublin addresses 
Colloquially, Dubliners simply refer to the area as "Dublin 1". The postal district forms the first part of numerous seven digit Eircodes that are unique to every single address in the area. For addressing purposes, it appears in both its original form as Dublin 1 and as the first part of a seven digit postal code as D01 a line below. For example:  
 Dublin City Gallery The Hugh Lane
 Charlemont House
 Parnell Square North
 Dublin 1
 D01 F2X9

Gallery

See also 

 List of Dublin postal districts
 List of Eircode routing areas in Ireland
 List of postal codes

References

Places in Dublin (city)
Postal districts of Dublin